Vernon is an unincorporated community in Winston County, Mississippi, United States. On April 27, 2011, a tornado hit 5 miles (8 km) southeast of Vernon as part of the 2011 Super Outbreak, damaging between 10 and 20 homes, knocking down numerous trees that blocked roads, and injuring seven people.

References

Unincorporated communities in Winston County, Mississippi
Unincorporated communities in Mississippi